Matthew Laflin (December 16, 1803 – May 20, 1897) was an American manufacturer of gunpowder, businessman, philanthropist, and an early pioneer of Chicago, Illinois.

Biography

Early life and ancestors
He was born on December 16, 1803, an American of Ulster Scots and early New England ancestry, at the Laflin-Phelps Homestead in Southwick, Hampden County, Massachusetts.  He was the son of Matthew Laflin, a gunpowder manufacturer and Lydia Rising, the daughter of Amos Rising.  He was the grandson of Matthew Laflin and Lucy Loomis and his great grandfather, Charles Laflin, migrated to the US in 1740 from Ulster, Ireland settling at Oxford, Worcester County, Massachusetts. Charles Laflin and his family were living at Oxford, Massachusetts, when he purchased land in 1749 in the Southern (South-) village (-wick) part of the town of Westfield, Massachusetts. After manufacturing saltpeter for the Massachusetts militia during the American Revolutionary War, he built a powder mill in Southwick, Massachusetts, and the family successfully entered the explosives business.

Marriage and family
He married in 1827 at Canton, Connecticut, Henrietta Armenia Hinman, the daughter of Ransom Hinman and Mary Battele.  She was born in Lee, Berkshire County, Massachusetts, on June 20, 1805, and died on February 12, 1834, in Canton, Hartford County, Connecticut.  Matthew and Henrietta  were the parents of three children. He married secondly, before 1837, Catherine King of Westfield, Massachusetts. She died in Chicago, Illinois, in 1891.

Their son, George H. Laflin, was born on July 19, 1828, at Canton, Connecticut. He died on July 24, 1904, at Pittsfield, Berkshire, Massachusetts. He married on September 3, 1851, at Pittsfield, Berkshire County, Massachusetts,  Mary Minerva Brewster, who born at Lenox, Massachusetts on January 24, 1832, and died at Chicago, Illinois on January 10, 1902.  She was the daughter of Dr. John Milton Brewster and Philena Higley.

Their daughter Georgina, a twin of George H., died as an infant. Their youngest son was Lycurgus Laflin.  He was born June 2, 1832, in Canton, Connecticut. He died on February 25, 1900, in Old Pt Comfort, Elizabeth Cty County, Virginia.

Career
He learned the trade from his father, also named Matthew Laflin, a manufacturer of gunpowder. He was attracted to Chicago because of the construction of the Illinois and Michigan Canal and hoped to sell gunpowder to the construction company. He quickly found a market for his product. The opening of the Illinois and Michigan Canal in 1848 allowed shipping from the Great Lakes through Chicago to the Mississippi River and the Gulf of Mexico. He relocated his family to Chicago in 1837 and his first home in Chicago was at Fort Dearborn, because no other shelter could be found in the young city.

With the money he made in the gunpowder business, he began to purchase large tracts of real estate and once owned  of land within the city limits. He bought the land for $300 and lived to see it worth millions. In 1849, he purchased  of land on the west side, extending eastward from Madison Street and Ogden Avenue. Here he built the Bull's Head Hotel,  resort for men in the cattle business. The hotel was constructed complete with barns, sheds and cattle pens and so established Chicago's first stock yards. After its heyday, the hotel was used as an asylum for alcoholics before being torn down.

In 1867, he refinanced the Elgin Watch Company when it was on the verge of failure, and became one of the largest stockholders in the company. The Laflin family sat on Elgin's board of directors for more than 70 years. It was his capital and enterprise that laid the foundation for Waukesha as a famous Wisconsin watering resort and he was the proprietor of the grand resort, the Fountain Spring House.  Waukesha was once known for its extremely clean and good-tasting spring water and was called a "spa town." This earned the city the nicknames, "Spring City," and "Saratoga of the West." In the summer of 1905 the Fountain Spring House was sold by the heirs of Matthew Laflin to the Metropolitan Church Association of Chicago.

He built one of the first plank roads, known in those days as the Blue Island toll road. He operated the first omnibus line to carry his hotel patrons to his stock yards and the State Street markets. He also established the first water works system in Chicago by building a pine-log reservoir at Lake Street and the lake shore. Water funneled into the reservoir was distributed through wooden pipes to the city. During the Civil War, he was a Union Democrat. Laflin was also a founding member of the Chicago Board of Trade.

He died in Chicago on May 20, 1897, and was buried at Rosehill Cemetery.

Honors and legacy

In 1892, Laflin made a lasting contribution to Chicago by donating $75,000 toward the building of a structure to house the Chicago Academy of Sciences, a scholarly society formed to promote the scientific investigation of natural history. As a result of Laflin's gift, the Academy of Sciences was granted a plot of land in Lincoln Park; the Lincoln Park Board of Commissioners then donated $25,000 in public funds to assure adequate financing for the project.

The building opened as the Matthew Laflin Memorial on October 31, 1894, and housed the academy until 1995 when it moved to a new building. The building reverted to the Chicago Park District, which rehabbed it into Lincoln Park Zoo administrative offices.

Laflin Street in Chicago begins 1500 West from 356 North to 12258 South, it is named in his honor.

Descendants
Matthew Laflin Rockwell, (1915–1988) was an American architect and director of planning for the U.S. Army Corps of Engineers and responsible for the site selection, plan and design of O'Hare International Airport.  He is a cousin of Sylvester "Pat" Laflin Weaver, actress Sigourney Weaver and comedian and actor Doodles Weaver. He is also the grandson of Francis Williams Rockwell, a United States representative from Massachusetts and the great grandson of Julius Rockwell, a United States politician from Massachusetts.

Notes

References
 Alft, E.C. and William H. Briska.  Elgin Time: A History of the Elgin National Watch Company, 1864-1968.  Elgin, IL: Elgin Historical Society, 2003.
Child, Hamilton. Gazetteer of Berkshire County, Mass., 1725-1885 Pittsfield. Publisher: Printed at the Journal Office, 1885.
Currey, Josiah Seymour. Chicago: Its History and Its Builders, a Century of Marvelous Growth, Volume 3  Chicago. Publisher: Clarke Publishing Company, 1912.
Currey, Josiah Seymour. Chicago: Its History and Its Builders, a Century of Marvelous Growth, Volume 5  Chicago. Publisher: Clarke Publishing Company, 1912.
Cutter, William Richard. New England families, genealogical and memorial: a record of the achievements of her people in the making of commonwealths and the founding of a nation, Volume 3 Publisher: Lewis Historical Publishing Company, 1913.
Higley, William Kerr. Special publication - Chicago Academy of Sciences, Issues 1-2 Chicago. Publisher: Chicago Academy of Sciences, Chicago Academy of Sciences, 1902.
Hinman, Royal Ralph.  A catalogue of the names of the early Puritan settlers of the colony of Connecticut: with the time of their arrival in the country and colony, their standing in society, place of residence, condition in life, where from, business, &c., as far as is found on record, Issue 1 Chicago. Publisher: Case, Tiffany, 1852.
Jones, Emma C. Brewster. The Brewster Genealogy, 1566-1907: a Record of the Descendants of William Brewster of the "Mayflower," ruling elder of the Pilgrim church which founded Plymouth Colony in 1620. New York: Grafton Press. 1908.
Otis, Philo Adams. The First Presbyterian church, 1833-1913: a history of the oldest organization in Chicago, with biographical sketches of the ministers and extracts from the choir records Chicago. Publisher: F. H. Revell Co., 1913.
Woods, Henry Ernest. Vital records of Becket, Massachusetts: to the year 1850 Boston. Publisher: New England historic genealogical society, at the charge of the Eddy town-record fund, 1903.
Woods, Henry Ernest. Vital records of Lee, Massachusetts, to the year 1850 Boston. Publisher: New England historic genealogical society, at the charge of the Eddy town-record fund, 1903.

Further reading
The Brewster Genealogy, 1566-1907: a Record of the Descendants of William Brewster of the "Mayflower," ruling elder of the Pilgrim church which founded Plymouth Colony in 1620. by Emma C. Brewster Jones, New York: Grafton Press. 1908
Fountain Spring House Hotel Matthew Laflin, Proprietor David Rumsey Collection.
Laflin & Rand Powder Company

American manufacturing businesspeople
Businesspeople from Chicago
Businesspeople from Wisconsin
People from Southwick, Massachusetts
People from Waukesha, Wisconsin
American hoteliers
American people of English descent
American people of Scotch-Irish descent
American people of Scottish descent
American Presbyterians
1803 births
1897 deaths
Businesspeople from Massachusetts
People from Canton, Connecticut
19th-century American businesspeople
Burials at Rosehill Cemetery